Thelma Coyne and Nancye Wynne secured their fifth consecutive title by defeating Joan Hartigan and Edie Niemeyer 7–5, 6–2 in the final, to win the women's doubles tennis title at the 1940 Australian Championships.

Seeds

  Thelma Coyne /  Nancye Wynne (champions)
  May Hardcastle /  Nell Hopman (quarterfinals)
  Alison Hattersley /  Olive Stebbing (semifinals)
  Joan Hartigan /  Edie Niemeyer (final)

Draw

Draw

Notes

References

External links
  Source for seedings and the draw

1940 in Australian tennis
1940 in women's tennis
1940 in Australian women's sport
Women's Doubles